Myiarchus is a genus of tyrant flycatchers. Most species are fairly similar looking and are easier to separate by voice than plumage.

Myiarchus flycatchers are fairly large tyrant-flycatchers at 16–23 cm (6.3–9 in) long. They are all partially crested with a brown to gray back and head, a rufous to blackish tail and yellow to pale underparts (only exception is the rufous flycatcher with rufous underparts). They typically forage by perching on an open branch and looking outward and downward for prey, which primarily consists of insects. Once it spots a potential meal, the flycatcher rapidly and directly flies at the insect, which is normally on the exposed upper surface of a leaf or twig. It hovers briefly before the insect before grabbing it in its beak and flying away to typically a new perch.

The genus contains 22 species:
 Rufous flycatcher, Myiarchus semirufus
 Yucatan flycatcher, Myiarchus yucatanensis
 Sad flycatcher, Myiarchus barbirostris
 Dusky-capped flycatcher, Myiarchus tuberculifer
 Swainson's flycatcher, Myiarchus swainsoni
 Venezuelan flycatcher, Myiarchus venezuelensis
 Panama flycatcher, Myiarchus panamensis
 Short-crested flycatcher, Myiarchus ferox
 Pale-edged flycatcher, Myiarchus cephalotes
 Sooty-crowned flycatcher, Myiarchus phaeocephalus
 Apical flycatcher, Myiarchus apicalis
 Ash-throated flycatcher, Myiarchus cinerascens
 Nutting's flycatcher, Myiarchus nuttingi
 Great crested flycatcher, Myiarchus crinitus
 Brown-crested flycatcher, Myiarchus tyrannulus
 Grenada flycatcher, Myiarchus nugator
 Galapagos flycatcher, Myiarchus magnirostris
 Rufous-tailed flycatcher, Myiarchus validus
 La Sagra's flycatcher, Myiarchus sagrae
 Stolid flycatcher, Myiarchus stolidus
 Lesser Antillean flycatcher, Myiarchus oberi
 Puerto Rican flycatcher, Myiarchus antillarum

References

External links
 
 

 
Bird genera